Lucy Elizabeth Simon (May 5, 1940 – October 20, 2022) was an American composer for the theatre and of popular songs. She recorded and performed as a singer and songwriter, and was known for the musicals The Secret Garden (1991) and Doctor Zhivago (2011).

In 1963, Simon began performing with her sister Carly Simon as the Simon Sisters. The duo released three albums, beginning with Meet the Simon Sisters, which featured the song "Winkin', Blinkin' and Nod"; based on the poem by Eugene Field, the song became a minor hit and reached No. 73 on the Billboard Hot 100. Simon won a Grammy Award in 1981 with her husband, David Levine, in the Best Recording for Children category for In Harmony, and again in 1983 in the same category for In Harmony 2. Simon received Tony Award and Drama Desk Award nominations for composing the music for the Broadway musical The Secret Garden.

Early life and education
Simon was born in New York City on May 5, 1940.  Her father, Richard L. Simon, was the co-founder of the book publisher Simon & Schuster, Inc.; her mother, Andrea (Heinemann) Simon, was a former switchboard operator, civil rights activist, and singer. She was the older sister of musician Carly Simon.  Her father was from a German Jewish family, while her maternal grandfather Friedrich was of German descent. Lucy's maternal grandmother, known as "Chibie", was a Roman Catholic from Cuba, and was of pardo heritage, a freed-slave descendant (the show Finding Your Roots tested Carly Simon's DNA as  "10 percent black"), and was sent to England and raised by nuns until the age of sixteen.

In addition to her younger sister Carly, she had an older sister, opera singer Joanna, and a younger brother, photographer Peter. Simon grew up in Fieldston, a section of Riverdale in the Bronx.  She attended the Fieldston School, before studying at Bennington College, graduating in 1962.

Career
Simon began her professional career singing folk tunes with sister Carly Simon as the Simon Sisters and later folk-rock. Simon's setting of "Wynken, Blynken, and Nod" has been recorded by many diverse artists, including the Doobie Brothers, Mitzie Collins, and the Big Three (Cass Elliot, Tim Rose, and James Hendricks).  In the mid-1970s, after a number of years away from recording, Lucy released two albums on the RCA label of mostly original compositions, along with a few collaborations and covers. Her self-titled debut album was more folk-rock in orientation while her second album, Stolen Time, had a contemporary pop sound. Carly Simon and James Taylor provided backing vocals on half of the songs from Stolen Time.

Simon won a Grammy Award in 1981 with her husband, David Levine, in the Best Recording for Children category for In Harmony: A Sesame Street Record, and again in 1983 in the same category for In Harmony 2.

Simon made her Broadway debut as the composer of The Secret Garden, for which she was nominated for a 1991 Tony Award for Best Original Score and a 1991 Drama Desk Award for Outstanding Music. She also wrote songs for the Off-Broadway show A... My Name Is Alice.

She composed the music for a musical version of the Russian novel Doctor Zhivago, with lyricists Michael Korie and Amy Powers and book writer Michael Weller.  The musical had its world premiere at the La Jolla Playhouse, San Diego, California, in May 2006. A new version of Doctor Zhivago ran in Sydney, Australia, Melbourne, and Brisbane in 2011 under the title Doctor Zhivago – A New Musical, starring Anthony Warlow in the title role and Lucy Maunder as Lara, the sensitive doctor's secret muse. The musical was produced by John Frost with Des McAnuff directing. Anthony Warlow starred in the Australian production of The Secret Garden and at that time Simon said of him, "There is my Zhivago". The musical premiered on Broadway on March 27, 2015 (previews), with an official opening on April 21, 2015, at the Broadway Theatre, but was not successful, closing after 26 previews and 23 regular performances.

Simon also contributed to the Off-Broadway musical Mama and Her Boys.

Personal life
Simon married David Y. Levine in 1967. They remained married for 55 years until her death.  Together, they had two children: Julie and James.

Simon died on October 20, 2022, aged 82, at her home in Piermont, New York. She had suffered from metastatic breast cancer prior to her death, which came just one day after her sister Joanna died of thyroid cancer.

Awards and nominations

Drama Desk Awards
The Drama Desk Awards is an annual prize recognizing excellence in New York theatre. The awards are considered a significant American theater distinction.

Grammy Awards
The Grammy Awards are awarded annually by The Recording Academy of the United States for outstanding achievements in the music industry. Often considered the highest music honour, the awards were established in 1958.

Tony Awards
The Tony Awards recognize the excellence in live Broadway theatre. The awards are presented by the American Theatre Wing and The Broadway League.

Discography

Studio albums
The Simon Sisters
 1964: Meet the Simon Sisters
 1966: Cuddlebug
 1969: The Simon Sisters Sing the Lobster Quadrille and Other Songs for Children
 1973: Lucy & Carly – The Simon Sisters Sing for Children 
 2006: Winkin', Blinkin' and Nod: The Kapp Recordings 
 2008: Carly & Lucy Simon Sing Songs for Children 

Solo
 1975: Lucy Simon
 1977: Stolen Time

Singles
The Simon Sisters
 1964: "Winkin', Blinkin' and Nod"

Solo

 1975: "Sally Go 'Round the Sun"
 1977: "If You Ever Believed"

Other appearances
 1980: "I Have a Song" by Lucy Simon – In Harmony: A Sesame Street Record
 1981: "Maryanne" by Lucy & Carly Simon – In Harmony 2
 1981: The Rodgers and Hart Album (Simon appears on two cuts of this William Bolcom and Joan Morris album)

References

External links
 

Pop Music and the New Musical – Working in the Theatre Seminar video at American Theatre Wing.org, September 2005
Biography at filmreference.com
 

Carly Simon
1940 births
2022 deaths 
Deaths from breast cancer 
Deaths from cancer in New York (state)
American musical theatre composers
Broadway composers and lyricists
Bennington College alumni
Musicians from the Bronx
People from Riverdale, Bronx
Grammy Award winners
Jewish American songwriters
American people of German-Jewish descent
American people of Swiss-German descent
American people of Cuban descent
Simon family (publishing)